Stefania coxi is a species of frog in the family Hemiphractidae.
It is endemic to Guyana and has been found on Mount Ayanganna and Mount Wokomung.
Its natural habitat is subtropical or tropical moist montane forests at higher elevations.

References

 MacCulloch, R.D. and A. Lathrop. 2002. Exceptional diversity of Stefania on Mount Ayanganna, Guyana: three new species and new distribution records. Herpetologica 58:327-346.
 MacCulloch, R.D. and A. Lathrop. 2006. Stefania coxi. Catalogue of American Amphibians and Reptiles 826: 1–2.
MacCulloch, R.D., A. Lathrop and S.Z. Khan. 2006. Exceptional diversity of Stefania (Anura: Cryptobatrachidae) II: six species from Mount Wokomung, Guyana. Phyllomedusa 5: 31–41.

Stefania
Endemic fauna of Guyana
Amphibians of Guyana
Taxonomy articles created by Polbot
Amphibians described in 2002